James Beeston  (born 17 September 1778) was an English professional cricketer who made 24 known appearances in first-class cricket matches from 1794 to 1808. He was mainly associated with Middlesex.

References

1778 births
English cricketers
English cricketers of 1787 to 1825
Middlesex cricketers
Year of death unknown
London Cricket Club cricketers
Non-international England cricketers
Lord Yarmouth's XI cricketers